Austin Czarnik (born December 12, 1992) is an American professional ice hockey center for the  Detroit Red Wings of the National Hockey League (NHL). Undrafted, Czarnik has also played in the NHL with the Boston Bruins, Calgary Flames, New York Islanders and Seattle Kraken.

Prior to turning professional, Czarnik attended Miami University for four years where he was named to the CCHA All-Conference First Team, AHCA All-American First Team, CCHA First Team, and NCHC All-Tournament Team.

Playing career
As a youth, Czarnik played in the 2005 Quebec International Pee-Wee Hockey Tournament with the Detroit Compuware minor ice hockey team.

Czarnik played four seasons of NCAA Division I hockey for the Miami RedHawks (2011–2015). In his sophomore year at Miami University, Czarnik's outstanding play was rewarded with a selection to the 2012–13 CCHA All-Conference First Team. On June 24, 2013, prior to the start of his junior season, Czarnik was named captain of the RedHawks by head coach Enrico Blasi. He held this position through the end of his senior season.

Days after Miami was eliminated from the 2015 NCAA Division I Men's Ice Hockey Tournament and his college career had come to a close, Czarnik signed an entry-level deal with the Boston Bruins on March 31, 2015. He was assigned to the Bruins' AHL affiliate, the Providence Bruins.

Prior to the 2016–17 NHL season, Czarnik made the Boston Bruins' roster out of training camp, making his NHL debut on October 13 for the Bruins' 6–3 win over the Columbus Blue Jackets. However, after two scoreless games and one healthy scratch with Boston, he was reassigned to Providence on October 20. However, following an elbow injury to David Backes, Boston recalled Czarnik on October 26. During a game that same day, Czarnik tallied his first NHL goal against the New York Rangers' Henrik Lundqvist in a 5–2 loss for the Bruins. On July 18, 2017, Czarnik was signed by the Bruins to a one-year contract to play in the 2017–18 season.

Czarnik participated in the Bruins training camp prior to the 2017–18 season, and made the opening night roster out of camp but was reassigned to the Providence Bruins after playing in two games. Czarnik and teammate Jordan Binnington were named the Providence Bruins representatives at the 2018 AHL All-Star Classic. He was later named to the AHL Second All-Star Team. After playing in 10 games with the Bruins during the 2017–18 season, Czarnik was reassigned to the AHL on February 10, where he remained for the rest of the season.

On July 1, 2018, having seen his career stall within the Bruins organization, Czarnik left as a free agent and secured a one-way, two-year, $2.5 million contract with the Calgary Flames. He made the Flames opening night roster out of training camp.

The New York Islanders signed Czarnik to a two-year deal, announced on October 13, 2020.  Czarnik was placed on waivers on January 11, 2021 and was cleared the following day. After being assigned to the taxi squad, Czarnik was promoted to the active roster on January 31, 2021.  Czarnik played his first game for the Islanders that evening, an OT loss to Philadelphia, 4-3.  Czarnik wore number 11, and played right wing on the third line, which is centered by J-G Pageau.  Czarnik saw a total of 14:12 of ice time, including action on the powerplay and penalty kill units.  On February 1, Czarnik returned to the taxi squad.

In the following 2021–22 season, Czarnik cleared waivers and began the season with newly renamed AHL affiliate, the Bridgeport Islanders. He registered 15 points through 20 regular season games before he was recalled to New York and added 2 goals and 5 points through 11 games. On February 8, 2022, Czarnik's tenure with the Islanders briefly ended as he was claimed off waivers by expansion club, the Seattle Kraken on February 8, 2022. Czarnik featured in just 6 games with the Kraken, registering two assists, only to be claimed back off waivers by the Islanders, on March 6, 2022. He was directly returned to Islanders AHL affiliate in Bridgeport.

On July 13, 2022, Czarnik signed a two-year, two-way contract with the Detroit Red Wings.

Personal life
Czarnik is the cousin of Eispiraten Crimmitschau center Robert Czarnik.

Career statistics

Regular season and playoffs

International

Awards and honors

References

External links 
 

1992 births
Living people
AHCA Division I men's ice hockey All-Americans
American men's ice hockey centers
American people of Slavic descent
Boston Bruins players
Bridgeport Islanders players
Calgary Flames players
Detroit Red Wings players
Grand Rapids Griffins players
Green Bay Gamblers players
Miami RedHawks men's ice hockey players
Ice hockey players from Michigan
New York Islanders players
Providence Bruins players
Seattle Kraken players
Stockton Heat players
Undrafted National Hockey League players
USA Hockey National Team Development Program players